"Let Me In" is a song written by Alan Osmond, Merrill Osmond, and Wayne Osmond and performed by The Osmonds.    It was featured on their 1973 album, The Plan. The song was produced by Alan Osmond.

Background
It broke from the group's string of harder rock-sounding hits through the early 1970s and began a string in which the band began playing up their image as teen idols and began releasing love ballads as singles. As with other songs on The Plan, "Let Me In" carries a dual message of secular and Mormon/Christian themes, both as a straightforward love song and as a plea to God for redemption from the singer's past abandonment of Him and a request to return to His love (akin to the parable of the prodigal son). The song marked the return of the formula of Merrill and Donny Osmond alternating on lead vocals, the formula the band had used while Donny was a boy soprano; by this point, Donny's voice had lowered to the tenor/baritone range he would have in adulthood. Merrill sang on the verses, with Donny (aided by Alan and Wayne in unison) singing the chorus.

Chart performance
In 1973, "Let Me In" reached No. 2 on the UK Singles Chart, #36 on the Billboard chart, No. 4 on the U.S. easy listening chart, No. 5 on Canadian adult contemporary chart, and #15 on the Canadian pop chart.

Weekly charts

Year-end charts

Other versions
OTT released a version of the song as a single in 1996 that reached No. 2 in Ireland and reissued in 1997 and reached No. 12 on the UK Singles Chart.

References

External links
 Lyrics of this song
 

1973 songs
1973 singles
1996 singles
1997 singles
The Osmonds songs
Songs written by Alan Osmond
Songs written by Merrill Osmond
Songs written by Wayne Osmond
MGM Records singles
Epic Records singles